The following is a list of notable Danish composers:


A B C D E F G H I J K L M N O P Q R S T U V W X Y Z

A

Thorvald Aagaard
Truid Aagesen
David Abell
Hans Abrahamsen
Aksel Agerby
Harald Agersnap
Georg Frederik Ferdinand Allen
Robert William Otto Allen
Arthur Ivan Allin
Birgitte Alsted
Herman Amberg
Johan Amberg
Aksel Andersen
Arvid Andersen
Benny Andersen
Daniel Andersen
Eyvin Andersen
Hakon Andersen
Joachim Andersen
Johannes Andersen
Fritz Andersen
Kai Normann Andersen
Sophus Andersen
Lotte Anker

B

Erik Bach
Kasper Bai
Frans Bak
Carl Christian Nicolaj Balle
Harald Balslev
Emilius Bangert
Christian Barnekow
Sigurd Barrett
Christian Frederik Barth
Frederik Philip Carl August Barth
Wilhelm Herman Barth
Johan Bartholdy
Rudolph Bay
Julius Bechgaard
Victor Bendix
Jørgen Bentzon
Niels Viggo Bentzon
Nicolai Berendt
Gunnar Berg

Andreas Peter Berggreen
Ilja Bergh
Rudolph Sophus Bergh
Niels Bernhart
Viggo Bielefeldt
Ludvig Birkedal-Barfod
Erling Bjerno
Thomas Blachman
Georg Carl Bohlmann
Elisabeth Boisen
Jørgen Ditleff Bondesen
Helge Bonnén
Melchior Borchgrevinck
Kim Borg

Axel Borup-Jørgensen
Hans Brachrogge
Steffen Brandt
Ivar Bredal
Erling Brene
Viggo Brodersen
Kai Aage Bruun
Peter Bruun
Ole Buck
Michael Bundesen
Carl Busch
Volkmar Busch
Dietrich Buxtehude
Erik Bøgh
Hakon Børresen

C
Camillo Carlsen
Henrik Carlsen
Bernhard Christensen
Asger Lund Christiansen
Henning Christiansen
Karl Clausen
Niels Clemmensen
Carl Cohn Haste
Victor Cornelius
Fritz Crome
Simoni Dall Croubelis

D
Balduin Dahl
Nancy Dalberg
Johan Darbes
Christian Debois
Søffren Degen
Nathanael Diesel
Jean Baptiste Édouard Du Puy
Otto Dütsch

E

Adolph Julius Eggers
Søren Nils Eichberg
Niels Eje
Henning Elbirk
Ejnar Emborg
Harald Bjerg Emborg
Jens Laursøn Emborg
Jørgen Emborg
Aage Emborg
August Enna
Poul Allin Erichsen
Morten Eskesen

F
Jacob Christian Fabricius
Bent Fabricius-Bjerre

Frederik Foersom
Peter Christian Foersom
Johan Foltmar
Ida Henriette da Fonseca
Julius Foss
John Frandsen
Axel Frederiksen
Johan Henrik Freithoff
Ivar Frounberg
Carl Johan Frydensberg
Johannes Frederik Frølich
Frederik Christian Funck
Peter Ferdinand Funck
Fuzzy
Johanne Fenger
Carl Gottlob Füssel

G

Ingolf Gabold
Axel Gade
Jacob Gade
Niels W. Gade
Johann Christian Gebauer
Christian Geisler
Christian Geist
Carl Ludvig Gerlach
Georg Gerson
W.H.R.R. Giedde
Lennart Ginman
Nicolo Gistou
Christian Henrik Glass
Louis Glass

Franz Joseph Glæser
Joseph Glæser
Peder Gram
Axel Grandjean
Lars Graugaard
Tekla Griebel-Wandall
Michael Ehregott Grose
Heinrich Ernst Grosmann
Jacob Groth
Georg Grothe
Launy Grøndahl
Peter Grønland
Pelle Gudmundsen-Holmgreen
Bo Gunge
Cornelius Gurlitt
Hugo Gyldmark
Sven Gyldmark
Birger Wøllner Gaarn

H

Sophus Hagen
Mads Hak
Andreas Hallager
Sophus Halle
Povl Hamburger
Asger Hamerik
Ebbe Hamerik
Margaret Hamerik
Jodle Birge
Christian Julius Hansen
Frants Johannes Hansen
Nicolaj Hansen
Robert Emil Hansen
Thorvald Hansen
Hans Hansen
Egil Harder
Knud Harder
August Wilhelm Hartmann

Emil Hartmann
Emma Hartmann
J.P.E. Hartmann
Johan Ernst Hartmann
Johann Hartmann
Lars Hegaard
Anton Hegner
Ludvig Hegner
Jørgen Heide
Peter Heise
Paul Hellmuth
Thomas Helmig
Carl Helsted
Edvard Helsted
Gustav Helsted
Edgar Henrichsen
Roger Henrichsen
Fini Henriques

Bent Hesselmann
Christian Hildebrandt
Niels Peter Hillebrandt
Bjørn Hjelmborg
Ludvig Holm
Mogens Winkel Holm
Vilhelm Christian Holm
Vagn Holmboe
Bo Holten
C.F.E. Horneman
Emil Horneman
Bjarne Hoyer
Johan Hye-Knudsen
Otto Hænning
Georg Høeberg
Finn Høffding

I
Johannes Erasmus Iversen

J
Ejnar Jacobsen
Jens Bjerre Jacobsen
Niels Peter Jensen
Knud Jeppesen
Jørgen Jersild
Axel Jørgensen
C.V. Jørgensen

K

Leif Kayser
Axel Kjerulf
Charles Kjerulf
Povl Kjøller
Paul von Klenau
Werner Knudsen
Jesper Koch
Anders Koppel
Herman D. Koppel
Thomas Koppel
Søren Kragh-Jacobsen
Peter Casper Krossing
Hans Ernst Krøyer
Friedrich Kuhlau
F.L.Æ. Kunzen
Jesper Kyd
Morten Kærså

L

Niels la Cour
Peter Erasmus Lange-Müller
Rued Langgaard
Kim Larsen
Søren Sebber Larsen
Thomas Laub
Bernhard Lewkovitch
Axel Liebmann
Nanna Liebmann
Lars Lilholt
Anne Linnet
Martin Lohse
Bent Lorentzen
Jakob Lorentzen
Hans Christian Lumbye
Tom Lundén

Frederikke Løvenskiold

M
Frederik Magle
Otto Malling
Marilyn Mazur
Carl Viggo Meincke
Sextus Miskow
Benna Moe
John Mogensen
Otto Mortensen
Erik Moseholm

N

Joachim Neergaard
Franz Xaver Neruda
Ulrik Neumann
Andreas P. Nielsen
Carl Nielsen
Ludolf Nielsen
Erik Norby
Heinrich von Nutzhorn
Cora Nyegaard
Per Nørgård
Ib Nørholm

O
Morten Olsen

P
Else Marie Pade
Steen Pade
Holger Simon Paulli
Gunner Møller Pedersen
Ivan Pedersen
Mogens Pedersøn
James Price

R

Christian Joseph Rasmussen
Karl Aage Rasmussen
Emil Reesen
Jascha Richter
Knudåge Riisager
Oluf Ring
Kjell Roikjer
Leopold Rosenfeld
Poul Ruders
Frederik Rung
Henrik Rung
P. S. Rung-Keller
Hanne Rømer

S
Thomas Sandberg
Sanne Salomonsen
Claus Schall
Peder Schall
Johann Adolph Scheibe
Poul Schierbeck
Poul Christian Schindler
Svend S. Schultz
Sebastian
Rudolph Simonsen
Svenn Skipper
Niels Skousen
Kira Skov
Bent Sørensen
Aage Stentoft
Bo Stief
Henrik Strube
John Sund

T

John Tchicai
Michael Teschl
Carl August Thielo
Knud Vad Thomsen
Kenneth Thordal
Peter Thorup
Leif Thybo

V
Karsten Vogel
Herman Friedrich Voltmar
Johan Voltmar

W

Morten Wedendahl
Flemming Weis
Tue West
Svend Westergaard
C. E. F. Weyse
Henriette Wienecke
K.A. Wieth-Knudsen
August Winding

Z
Hardenack Otto Conrad Zinck

 
Danish